The atmosphere of Titan is the dense layer of gases surrounding Titan, the largest moon of Saturn. It is the only thick atmosphere of a natural satellite in the Solar System. Titan's lower atmosphere is primarily composed of nitrogen (94.2%), methane (5.65%), and hydrogen (0.099%). There are trace amounts of other hydrocarbons, such as ethane, diacetylene, methylacetylene, acetylene, propane, PAHs and of other gases, such as cyanoacetylene, hydrogen cyanide, carbon dioxide, carbon monoxide, cyanogen, acetonitrile, argon and helium. The isotopic study of nitrogen isotopes ratio also suggest acetonitrile may be present in quantities exceeding hydrogen cyanide and cyanoacetylene. The surface pressure is about 50% higher than on Earth at 1.5 bars (147 kPa) which is near the triple point of methane and allows there to be gaseous methane in the atmosphere and liquid methane on the surface. The orange color as seen from space is produced by other more complex chemicals in small quantities, possibly tholins, tar-like organic precipitates.

Observational history 
The presence of a significant atmosphere was first suspected by Spanish astronomer Josep Comas i Solà, who observed distinct limb darkening on Titan in 1903 from the Fabra Observatory in Barcelona, Catalonia. This observation was confirmed by Dutch astronomer Gerard P. Kuiper in 1944 using a spectroscopic technique that yielded an estimate of an atmospheric partial pressure of methane of the order of 100 millibars (10 kPa). Subsequent observations in the 1970s showed that Kuiper's figures had been significant underestimates; methane abundances in Titan's atmosphere were ten times higher, and the surface pressure was at least double what he had predicted. The high surface pressure meant that methane could only form a small fraction of Titan's atmosphere. In 1980, Voyager 1 made the first detailed observations of Titan's atmosphere, revealing that its surface pressure was higher than Earth's, at 1.5 bars (about 1.48 times that of Earth's).

The joint NASA/ESA Cassini-Huygens mission provided a wealth of information about Titan, and the Saturn system in general, since entering orbit on July 1, 2004. It was determined that Titan's atmospheric isotopic abundances were evidence that the abundant nitrogen in the atmosphere came from materials in the Oort cloud, associated with comets, and not from the materials that formed Saturn in earlier times. It was determined that complex organic chemicals could arise on Titan, including polycyclic aromatic hydrocarbons, propylene, and methane.

The Dragonfly mission by NASA is planning to land a large aerial vehicle on Titan in 2034. The mission will study Titan's habitability and prebiotic chemistry at various locations. The drone-like aircraft will perform measurements of geologic processes, and surface and atmospheric composition.

Overview 
Observations from the Voyager space probes have shown that the Titanean atmosphere is denser than Earth's, with a surface pressure about 1.48 times that of Earth's. Titan's atmosphere is about 1.19 times as massive as Earth's overall, or about 7.3 times more massive on a per surface area basis. It supports opaque haze layers that block most visible light from the Sun and other sources and renders Titan's surface features obscure. The atmosphere is so thick and the gravity so low that humans could fly through it by flapping "wings" attached to their arms. Titan's lower gravity means that its atmosphere is far more extended than Earth's; even at a distance of 975 km, the Cassini spacecraft had to make adjustments to maintain a stable orbit against atmospheric drag. The atmosphere of Titan is opaque at many wavelengths and a complete reflectance spectrum of the surface is impossible to acquire from the outside. It was not until the arrival of Cassini–Huygens in 2004 that the first direct images of Titan's surface were obtained. The Huygens probe was unable to detect the direction of the Sun during its descent, and although it was able to take images from the surface, the Huygens team likened the process to "taking pictures of an asphalt parking lot at dusk".

Vertical structure 
Titan's vertical atmospheric structure is similar to Earth. They both have a troposphere, stratosphere, mesosphere, and thermosphere. However, Titan's lower surface gravity creates a more extended atmosphere, with scale heights of 15–50 km (9–31 mi) in comparison to 5–8 km (3.1-5 mi) on Earth. Voyager data, combined with data from Huygens and radiative-convective models provide increased understanding of Titan's atmospheric structure.

 Troposphere: This is the layer where a lot of the weather occurs on Titan. Since methane condenses out of Titan's atmosphere at high altitudes, its abundance increases below the tropopause at an altitude of 32 km (20 mi), leveling off at a value of 4.9% between 8 km (5 mi) and the surface. Methane rain, haze rainout, and varying cloud layers are found in the troposphere.
 Stratosphere: The atmospheric composition in the stratosphere is 98.4% nitrogen—the only dense, nitrogen-rich atmosphere in the Solar System aside from Earth's—with the remaining 1.6% composed mostly of methane (1.4%) and hydrogen (0.1–0.2%). The main tholin haze layer lies in the stratosphere at about 100–210 km (62–130 mi). In this layer of the atmosphere there is a strong temperature inversion caused by the haze due to a high ratio of shortwave to infrared opacity.
 Mesosphere: A detached haze layer is found at about 450–500 km (280-310 mi), within the mesosphere. The temperature at this layer is similar to that of the thermosphere because of the cooling of hydrogen cyanide (HCN) lines.
 Thermosphere: Particle production begins in the thermosphere This was concluded after finding and measuring heavy ions and particles. This was also Cassini's closest approach in Titan's atmosphere.
 Ionosphere:  Titan's ionosphere is also more complex than Earth's, with the main ionosphere at an altitude of 1,200 km (750 mi) but with an additional layer of charged particles at 63 km (39 mi). This splits Titan's atmosphere to some extent into two separate radio-resonating chambers. The source of natural extremely-low-frequency (ELF) waves on Titan, as detected by Cassini–Huygens, is unclear as there does not appear to be lightning activity. The main sources of Titan's ionosphere are solar irradiance, Saturn's magnetospheric electrons and ions, drifting along the magnetic field lines, and galactic cosmic rays (see more in ).

Atmospheric composition and chemistry 
Titan's atmospheric chemistry is diverse and complex. Each layer of the atmosphere has unique chemical interactions occurring within that are then interacting with other sub layers in the atmosphere. For instance, the hydrocarbons are thought to form in Titan's upper atmosphere in reactions resulting from the breakup of methane by the Sun's ultraviolet light, producing a thick orange smog. The table below highlights the production and loss mechanisms of the most abundant photochemically produced molecules in Titan's atmosphere.

Magnetic field 
Titan's internal magnetic field is negligible, and perhaps even nonexistent, although studies in 2008 showed that Titan retains remnants of Saturn's magnetic field on the brief occasions when it passes outside Saturn's magnetosphere and is directly exposed to the solar wind. This may ionize and carry away some molecules from the top of the atmosphere. One interesting case was detected as an example of the coronal mass ejection impact onto Saturn's magnetosphere, causing Titan's orbit to be exposed to the shocked solar wind in the magnetosheath. This leads to the increased particle precipitation and the formation of extreme electron densities in Titan's ionosphere. Its orbital distance of 20.3 Saturn radii does place it within Saturn's magnetosphere occasionally. That can actually intensify reactions causing atmospheric loss, instead of guarding the atmosphere from the solar wind.

Chemistry of the ionosphere 
In November 2007, scientists uncovered evidence of negative ions with roughly 13 800 times the mass of hydrogen in Titan's ionosphere, which are thought to fall into the lower regions to form the orange haze which obscures Titan's surface. The smaller negative ions have been identified as linear carbon chain anions with larger molecules displaying evidence of more complex structures, possibly derived from benzene. These negative ions appear to play a key role in the formation of more complex molecules, which are thought to be tholins, and may form the basis for polycyclic aromatic hydrocarbons, cyanopolyynes and their derivatives. Remarkably, negative ions such as these have previously been shown to enhance the production of larger organic molecules in molecular clouds beyond our Solar System, a similarity which highlights the possible wider relevance of Titan's negative ions.

Atmospheric circulation 

There is a pattern of air circulation found flowing in the direction of Titan's rotation, from west to east. In addition, seasonal variation in the atmospheric circulation has also been detected. Observations by Cassini of the atmosphere made in 2004 also suggest that Titan is a "super rotator", like Venus, with an atmosphere that rotates much faster than its surface. The atmospheric circulation is explained by a big Hadley circulation that is occurring from pole to pole.

Methane cycle 

Similar to the hydrological cycle on Earth, Titan features a methane cycle. This methane cycle results in surface formations that resemble formations we find on Earth. Lakes of methane and ethane are found across Titan's polar regions. Methane condenses into clouds in the atmosphere, and then precipitates onto the surface. This liquid methane then flows into the lakes. Some of the methane in the lakes will evaporate over time, and form clouds in the atmosphere again, starting the process over. However, since methane is lost in the thermosphere, there has to be a source of methane to replenish atmospheric methane. Energy from the Sun should have converted all traces of methane in Titan's atmosphere into more complex hydrocarbons within 50 million years — a short time compared to the age of the Solar System. This suggests that methane must be somehow replenished by a reservoir on or within Titan itself. Most of the methane on Titan is in the atmosphere. Methane is transported through the cold trap at the tropopause. Therefore the circulation of methane in the atmosphere influences the radiation balance and chemistry of other layers in the atmosphere. If there is a reservoir of methane on Titan, the cycle would only be stable over geologic timescales. 

Evidence that Titan's atmosphere contains over a thousand times more methane than carbon monoxide would appear to rule out significant contributions from cometary impacts, because comets are composed of more carbon monoxide than methane. That Titan might have accreted an atmosphere from the early Saturnian nebula at the time of formation also seems unlikely; in such a case, it ought to have atmospheric abundances similar to the solar nebula, including hydrogen and neon. Many astronomers have suggested that the ultimate origin for the methane in Titan's atmosphere is from within Titan itself, released via eruptions from cryovolcanoes. 

Another possible source for methane replenishment in Titan's atmosphere is methane clathrates. Clathrates are compounds in which an ice lattice surrounds a gas particle, much like a cage. In this case, methane gas is surrounded by a water crystal cage. These methane clathrates could be present underneath Titan's icy surface, having formed much earlier in Titan's history. Through the dissociation of methane clathrates, methane could be outgassed into the atmosphere, replenishing the supply. 

On December 1, 2022, astronomers reported viewing clouds, likely made of methane, moving across Titan, using the James Webb Space Telescope.

Daytime and Twilight (sunrise/sunset) Skies 

Sky brightness and viewing conditions are expected to be quite different from Earth and Mars due to Titan's farther distance from the Sun (~10 AU) and complex haze layers in its atmosphere. The sky brightness model videos show what a typical sunny day may look like standing on the surface of Titan based on radiative transfer models.

For astronauts who see with visible light, the daytime sky has a distinctly dark orange color and appears uniform in all directions due to significant Mie scattering from the many high-altitude haze layers. The daytime sky is calculated to be ~100-1000 times dimmer than an afternoon on Earth, which is similar to the viewing conditions of a thick smog or dense fire smoke. The sunsets on Titan are expected to be "underwhelming events", where the Sun disappears about half-way up in the sky (~50° above the horizon) with no distinct change in color. After that, the sky will slowly darken until it reaches night. However, the surface is expected to remain as bright as the full Moon up to 1 Earth day after sunset.

In near-infrared light, the sunsets resemble a Martian sunset or dusty desert sunset. Mie scattering has a weaker influence at longer infrared wavelengths, allowing for more colorful and variable sky conditions. During the daytime, the Sun has a noticeable solar corona that transitions color from white to "red" over the afternoon. The afternoon sky brightness is ~100 times dimmer than Earth. As evening time approaches, the Sun is expected to disappear fairly close to the horizon. Titan's atmospheric optical depth is the lowest at 5 microns. So, the Sun at 5 microns may even be visible when it is below the horizon due to atmospheric refraction. Similar to images of Martian sunsets from Mars rovers, a fan-like corona is seen to develop above the Sun due to scattering from haze or dust at high-altitudes.

In regards to Saturn, the planet is nearly fixed in its position in the sky because Titan's orbit is tidally locked around Saturn. However, there is a small 3° east-to-west motion over a Titan year due to the orbital eccentricity, similar to the analemma on Earth. Sunlight reflected off of Saturn, Saturnshine, is about 1000 times weaker than solar insolation on the surface of Titan. Even though Saturn appears several times bigger in the sky than the Moon in Earth's sky, the outline of Saturn is masked out by the brighter Sun during the daytime. Saturn may only become discernible at night, but only at a wavelength of 5 microns. This is due to two factors: the small optical depth of Titan's atmosphere at 5 microns and the strong 5 μm emissions from Saturn's night side. In visible light, Saturn will make the sky on Titan's Saturn-facing side appear slightly brighter, similar to an overcast night with a full moon on Earth. Saturn's rings are hidden from view owing to the alignment of Titan's orbital plane and the plane of the rings. Saturn is expected to show phases, akin to the phases of Venus on Earth, that partially illuminate the surface of Titan at night, except for eclipses.

From outer space, Cassini images from near-infrared to UV wavelengths have shown that the twilight periods (phase angles > 150°) are brighter than the daytime on Titan. This observation has not been observed on any other planetary body with a thick atmosphere. The Titanean twilight outshining the dayside is due to a combination of Titan's atmosphere extending hundreds of kilometers above the surface and intense forward Mie scattering from the haze. Radiative transfer models have not reproduced this effect.

Atmospheric evolution 
The persistence of a dense atmosphere on Titan has been enigmatic as the atmospheres of the structurally similar satellites of Jupiter, Ganymede and Callisto, are negligible. Although the disparity is still poorly understood, data from recent missions have provided basic constraints on the evolution of Titan's atmosphere.

Roughly speaking, at the distance of Saturn, solar insolation and solar wind flux are sufficiently low that elements and compounds that are volatile on the terrestrial planets tend to accumulate in all three phases. Titan's surface temperature is also quite low, about 94 K (-179 C/-290 F).  Consequently, the mass fractions of substances that can become atmospheric constituents are much larger on Titan than on Earth. In fact, current interpretations suggest that only about 50% of Titan's mass is silicates, with the rest consisting primarily of various H2O (water) ices and NH3·H2O (ammonia hydrates). NH3, which may be the original source of Titan's atmospheric N2 (dinitrogen), may constitute as much as 8% of the NH3·H2O mass. Titan is most likely differentiated into layers, where the liquid water layer beneath ice Ih may be rich in NH3.

Tentative constraints are available, with the current loss mostly due to low gravity and solar wind aided by photolysis. The loss of Titan's early atmosphere can be estimated with the 14N–15N isotopic ratio, because the lighter 14N is preferentially lost from the upper atmosphere under photolysis and heating. Because Titan's original 14N–15N ratio is poorly constrained, the early atmosphere may have had more N2 by factors ranging from 1.5 to 100 with certainty only in the lower factor. Because N2 is the primary component (98%) of Titan's atmosphere, the isotopic ratio suggests that much of the atmosphere has been lost over geologic time. Nevertheless, atmospheric pressure on its surface remains nearly 1.5 times that of Earth as it began with a proportionally greater volatile budget than Earth or Mars. It is possible that most of the atmospheric loss was within 50 million years of accretion, from a highly energetic escape of light atoms carrying away a large portion of the atmosphere (hydrodynamic escape). Such an event could be driven by heating and photolysis effects of the early Sun's higher output of X-ray and ultraviolet (XUV) photons.

Because Callisto and Ganymede are structurally similar to Titan, it is unclear why their atmospheres are insignificant relative to Titan's. Nevertheless, the origin of Titan's N2 via geologically ancient photolysis of accreted and degassed NH3, as opposed to degassing of N2 from accretionary clathrates, may be the key to a correct inference. Had N2 been released from clathrates, 36Ar and 38Ar that are inert primordial isotopes of the Solar System should also be present in the atmosphere, but neither has been detected in significant quantities. The insignificant concentration of 36Ar and 38Ar also indicates that the ~40 K temperature required to trap them and N2 in clathrates did not exist in the Saturnian sub-nebula. Instead, the temperature may have been higher than 75 K, limiting even the accumulation of NH3 as hydrates. Temperatures would have been even higher in the Jovian sub-nebula due to the greater gravitational potential energy release, mass, and proximity to the Sun, greatly reducing the NH3 inventory accreted by Callisto and Ganymede. The resulting N2 atmospheres may have been too thin to survive the atmospheric erosion effects that Titan has withstood.

An alternative explanation is that cometary impacts release more energy on Callisto and Ganymede than they do at Titan due to the higher gravitational field of Jupiter. That could erode the atmospheres of Callisto and Ganymede, whereas the cometary material would actually build Titan's atmosphere. However, the 2H–1H (i.e. The difference suggests that cometary material is unlikely to be the major contributor to Titan's atmosphere. Titan's atmosphere also contains over a thousand times more methane than carbon monoxide which supports the idea that cometary material is not a likely contributor since comets are composed of more carbon monoxide than methane.

See also 
Atmosphere of Venus
Atmosphere of Earth
Atmosphere of Mars

References

Further reading

External links 
 

Titan (moon)
Titan